The third season of the anime series Yu-Gi-Oh! Duel Monsters, created by Kazuki Takahashi, was originally broadcast from March 12, 2002, to February 11, 2003. The English adaptation, broadcast on Kids' WB, aired from November 1, 2003 to September 4, 2004. 

The first half of the season follows an original story arc, where Yugi and his friends are transported to a digital universe, created and controlled by Noah, Seto Kaiba's adoptive brother. They are forced to duel the Big Five in order to escape with their minds in their own bodies. The second half of the season focuses on the resumption of the Battle City tournament finals, where the final four duelists, Yugi, Joey (Jonouchi), Kaiba, and Marik, fight for the championship title.

The third season of Yu-Gi-Oh! Duel Monsters (also renamed as Yu-Gi-Oh! Enter the Shadow Realm in the English-dubbed adaptation) was formerly licensed by 4Kids Entertainment in North America and other English-speaking countries, and was also distributed by Funimation through North American home video distribution rights and also distributed by Warner Bros. Television Animation on North American television rights, when it aired on Kids’ WB! and Cartoon Network, also in North America. It is now licensed and distributed by 4K Media.

Cast and characters

Japanese

Regular
 Hidehiro Kikuchi as Hiroto Honda
 Hiroki Takahashi as Katsuya Jonouchi
 Kenjiro Tsuda as Seto Kaiba
 Maki Saitoh as Anzu Mazaki
 Shunsuke Kazama as Yugi Moto/Yami Yugi

Recurring
 Chisa Yokoyama as Noa Kaiba
 Haruhi Terada as Mai Kujaku
 Hiroomi Sugino as Souichiro Ota
 Hisashi Izumi as Kogoro Daimon
 Junkoh Takeuchi as Mokuba Kaiba
 Konta as Rashid Ishtar
 Mika Sakenobe as Shizuka Kawai
 Rica Matsumoto as Ryou Bakura/Yami Bakura
 Ryo Naitou as Ryuji Otogi
 Ryousuke Otani as Shuzo Otaki
 Shinichi Yashiro as Chikuzen Oka
 Shin-tarou Sonooka as Kounosuke Oshita
 Sumi Shimamoto as Isis Ishtar
 Tadashi Miyazawa as Sugoroku Mutou
 Tetsuya Iwanaga as Malik Ishtar
 Tetsuo Komura as Gozaburo Kaiba

Minor
 Masami Suzuki as Ghost Kotsuzuka
 Norihisa Mori as Satake
 Sakura Nogawa as Isis Ishtar (child)

English

Regular
 Amy Birnbaum as Téa Gardner
 Greg Abbey as Tristan Taylor
 Wayne Grayson as Joey Wheeler
 Dan Green as Yugi Muto/Yami Yugi
 Eric Stuart as Seto Kaiba

Recurring
 Michael Alston Baley as Odion Ishtar
 Maddie Blaustein as Solomon Muto
 Megan Hollingshead as Mai Valentine
 Tara Jayne as Mokuba Kaiba
 Karen Neil as Ishizu Ishtar
 Lisa Ortiz as Serenity Wheeler
 Andrew Rannells as Noah Kaiba
 J.T. Ross as Marik Ishtar/Yami Marik 
 Marc Thompson as Duke Devlin and Gansley
 Robert O'Gorman as Crump
 David Wills as Gozaburo Kaiba and Nezbitt
 Tom Souhrada as Leichter
 Christopher Collet as Johnson
 Ted Lewis as Bakura Ryou/Yami Bakura

Episodes

Home media
Between March and October 2005, Funimation Productions released the second half of the season over five volumes of DVDs, each containing 4 - 5 episodes. They later released the complete season on July 29, 2008. In late 2013, Cinedigm and 4K Media Inc. reached a distribution agreement that would result in the release of every episode from the Yu-Gi-Oh! franchise on DVD and Blu-ray and to digital retailers.  The complete third season, titled Yu-Gi-Oh! Classic: Season 3, was released on January 14, 2014, on DVD. It was also released in two volumes, like the previous seasons, on the same day both digitally and on DVD.

DVD release

References

General

Specific

2002 Japanese television seasons
2003 Japanese television seasons
Duel Monsters (season 2)